John Kenny is the name of:
 John Kenny (trombonist) (born 1957), British trombonist and composer
 John Martin Kenny (died 1918), Australian superintendent
 John V. Kenny (1893–1975), Mayor of Jersey City (1949–1953)
 John Patrick Kenny (born 1942), British entrepreneur
 John Kenny (cricketer) (1883-1937), New Zealand cricketer
 John Kenny (politician) (1889–1978), Australian politician
 John Kenny (rugby league), English rugby league footballer
 John Kenny (Clan-na-Gael) (1847–1924), Irish republican
 Johnjo Kenny (John Kenny, John Jo Kenny) (born 1961), Scottish and Irish curler and coach

See also
 Jon Kenny (born 1957), Irish comedian
 John Kenney (disambiguation)
 Jack Kenny (born 1958), American writer